J'Adore is a Romanian language free shopping magazine published since 2004 in Cluj-Napoca, Romania, featuring local shopping interest. The magazine is published on a monthly basis. In 2006, Caţavencu Group acquired the magazine and launched a franchise Bucharest version of the magazine in 2007.

References

External links
Official website of the Bucharest edition

2004 establishments in Romania
Consumer magazines
Free magazines
Local interest magazines
Magazines established in 2004
Mass media in Cluj-Napoca
Magazines published in Romania
Romanian-language magazines
Monthly magazines published in Romania